The United States District Court for the District of Delaware (in case citations, D. Del.) is the Federal district court having jurisdiction over the entire state of Delaware. The Court sits in Wilmington. Currently, four district judges and five magistrate judges preside over the court.

Because Delaware is the state of incorporation for most major U.S. corporations, the District of Delaware hears and tries many patent and other complex commercial disputes that must be heard in federal court for diversity of citizenship reasons, and hears many appeals from bankruptcy disputes which are filed with the United States Bankruptcy Court for the District of Delaware.

Appeals from the Court are heard by the United States Court of Appeals for the Third Circuit, which sits in Philadelphia, Pennsylvania (except for patent claims and claims against the U.S. government under the Tucker Act, which are appealed to the Federal Circuit).

The current United States Attorney for the District of Delaware is David C. Weiss since January 22, 2018.

History 

The court was one of the original 13 courts established by the Judiciary Act of 1789, on September 24, 1789. From its establishment until 1946, the court had a single judge.

Current judges 
:

Vacancies and pending nominations

Former judges

Chief judges

Succession of seats

United States Attorney for the District of Delaware

See also 
 Courts of Delaware
 List of current United States district judges
 List of United States federal courthouses in Delaware

References

External links 
 United States District Court for the District of Delaware
 U.S. District Court of Delaware, Legislative history, Federal Judicial Center.

Delaware law
Delaware
Wilmington, Delaware
1789 establishments in Delaware
Courts and tribunals established in 1789

United States Attorneys for the District of Delaware